= El Salado, Catamarca =

Coordinates: 28°18′S 67°15′W

El Salado (Catamarca)
- Municipality and village
- Interactive map of El Salado (Catamarca)
- Country: Argentina
- Province: Catamarca Province
- Time zone: UTC−3 (ART)

El Salado (Catamarca) is a village and municipality in Catamarca Province in northwestern Argentina.
